Murder Comes to Eden is a murder mystery novel written by Leslie Ford. It was published in hardcover by Charles Scribner's Sons in 1955.

External links 
Murder Comes to Eden at Fantastic Fiction
Murder Comes to Eden at Goodreads

1955 American novels
American mystery novels
Charles Scribner's Sons books